Dwell is the sixth studio album by German musician Recondite. It was released on 24 January 2020 through Ghostly International.

Track listing

References

2020 albums
Ghostly International albums
Recondite albums